Roy William Wier (February 25, 1888 – June 27, 1963) was a U.S. Representative from Minnesota.

Wier was born in Redfield, Spink County, South Dakota, February 25, 1888. He moved with his parents in 1896 to Minneapolis, Hennepin County, Minnesota, and attended the public schools and North High School. He learned the telephone and electrical trade, later going into theatrical stage-lighting work.

During World War I Wier served in the United States Army for eighteen months, with overseas service. In 1920 he became active in the trade-union movement in Minneapolis and was an official representative of the Trades and Labor Assembly of Minneapolis. Wier was a member of the Minnesota House of Representatives, 1933 – 1939; of the Minneapolis Board of Education, 1939 – 1948, and of the board of directors of the Hennepin County Red Cross.

He was elected as a member of the Democratic-Farmer-Labor Party to the 81st through the 86th Congresses (January 3, 1949 – January 3, 1961). He was unsuccessful for reelection in 1960.

Wier was a resident of Minneapolis until May 1962, when he moved to Edmonds, Washington. He died in Seattle, King County, Washington, June 27, 1963; his remains were cremated and the ashes deposited in the columbarium of Evergreen Washelli Cemetery.

References
Minnesota Legislators Past and Present

1888 births
1963 deaths
Businesspeople from Minneapolis
Military personnel from Minneapolis
Politicians from Minneapolis
People from Redfield, South Dakota
Democratic Party members of the United States House of Representatives from Minnesota
Democratic Party members of the Minnesota House of Representatives
School board members in Minnesota
United States Army personnel of World War I
20th-century American politicians
North Community High School alumni